"Sillyworld" is the third single from Stone Sour's 2006 album Come What(ever) May. It reached number two on the Mainstream Rock charts in 2007. A video for the song,  directed by David Brucha, was released in February 2007, combining images of corporate America with pictures of clenched fists of resistance, revolutionists such as Mao Zedong, Ayatollah Khomeini, Che Guevara, and AK-47 assault rifles. According to the Roadrunner Records website: "The video for Stone Sour's 'Silly World' takes a crack at all the bullshit going on in the world today...apathy, tyranny, poverty, violence, and greed are all targets."

The lyrics are a critique of how ideas are becoming nothing but symbols through media corruption, and then dying off as they lose their significance. It speaks of instances such as love becoming "Just a song," or peace being "Just two fingers now... just a phase." Similar to "Through Glass", the content of the song is angry and has rebellious undertone, despite its softer, slower instrumental style.

The song was first time performed live on the 16 November 2007 at Pumpehuset in Copenhagen, Denmark.

Track listing

Chart positions

References

External links 
 The video

2007 singles
2006 songs
Stone Sour songs
Songs written by Corey Taylor
Songs written by Shawn Economaki
Songs written by Josh Rand
Songs written by Jim Root
Song recordings produced by Nick Raskulinecz
Roadrunner Records singles
Post-grunge songs